Francis John Leonard Skuce (1926-1982) was an Irish Anglican priest: he was Archdeacon of Clogher from 1973 until his death.

Skuce was educated at Trinity College, Dublin  and ordained in 1951. After  a curacy at Warrenpoint he was the incumbent at Inishmacsaint from 1953 until his death.

References

1926 births
1982 deaths
Archdeacons of Clogher
Alumni of Trinity College Dublin
20th-century Irish Anglican priests